Torab may refer to:
 Torab, Kerman
 Torab, Kermanshah
 Torab, Kohgiluyeh and Boyer-Ahmad
 Torab-e Olya, Kohgiluyeh and Boyer-Ahmad Province
 Torab-e Sofla, Kohgiluyeh and Boyer-Ahmad Province
 Torab-e Vosta, Kohgiluyeh and Boyer-Ahmad Province